Singaram is a village in Yadadri Bhuvanagiri district in Andhra Pradesh, India. It falls under Rajapeta mandal.

References

Villages in Yadadri Bhuvanagiri district